Dikdaraq (also Romanized as Dīkdaraq; also known as Dīg Daraq) is a village in Yaft Rural District, Moradlu District, Meshgin Shahr County, Ardabil Province, Iran. At the 2006 census, its population was 50, in 12 families.

References 

Dikdaraq is a village in Iran located in Ardebil province which is located in the village. [1]  Decker has a population of 35 people.  And among the rocky mountains and rock like (Mashgli, Gurubeh, ag kuhul  ...) that will be attractive and different for tourists and nature photographers

Shepherd's castle ( choban galasi ) is also located in this beautiful and unknown village, which is set opposite the castle of ghah ghah, where the inhabitants of the village are governed by livestock and horticulture, from the village's horticultural products, white berries, walnuts, figs, dried berries.  The area has enjoyed great excitement and public speaking. The founders of this village are the late Karbala'i Abutaleb Shokri, Gul Qassim Rouhi, Abbas Ali Mohammadi, Tapi Topdouqi and other deceased.
Towns and villages in Meshgin Shahr County